MV Sun Sea is a Thai cargo ship that brought 492 Sri Lankan Tamils into British Columbia in August 2010. Following their arrival, the passengers—seeking refuge in Canada after the Sri Lankan Civil War—were transferred to detention facilities in the Lower Mainland, for which the Canadian Government would garner heavy criticism from various Canadian advocacy groups.

The Incident 
The MV Sun Sea was tracked by the United States and Canada since June 2010 to anticipate where the ship would arrive. It intercepted off the coast of British Columbia on August 12, 2010, and boarded by Canadian authorities. All made refugee claims due to violence in Sri Lanka and the Sri Lankan Civil War.

On August 14 and 15, the adult migrants were transferred to "accommodation and detention facilities" in the Lower Mainland, while minors were taken to low-risk facilities, with their mothers if they were accompanied.

Aftermath 
In February 2011, the incident was estimated to have cost the federal government $25 million.

On February 10, 2011, Amnesty International Canada, the Canadian Council for Refugees, the Canadian Tamil Congress, and the International Civil Liberties Monitoring Group criticized "the government's aggressive efforts to keep the passengers of the MV Sun Sea in detention," claiming that
In 2012, Prime Minister Stephen Harper gave Thailand $12 million to battle human smuggling operations, and the government toughened immigration laws and penalties on human smugglers. Six suspects—two Canadians and four Sri Lankans—were charged in connection with the case.

In May 2018, Public Works and Government Services of Canada issued Letter of Interest for vessel Disposal scheduled to be complete by March 31, 2019. As of August 2019, the vessel was moved to the Nanaimo Shipyard. The disposal contract was awarded to Canadian Maritime Engineering of Victoria, British Columbia for scrapping. Entire ship-breaking was completed in December 2019.

Passengers 
As of May 18, 2012, the majority of the passengers had been released, with refugee claims in progress. Two were in police custody, three were in Canada Border Services Agency detention, nineteen had been given deportation orders for alleged crimes, six had been accepted as refugees, and six had had their claims rejected.

At least one of the passengers from Sun Sea who was deported from Canada was detained and tortured by Sri Lankan authorities. In July 2011, Sathyapavan Aseervatham, one of the passengers on Sun Sea, was deported from Canada to Sri Lanka, where he was arrested by authorities upon his arrival and detained for over one year. After his releases from custody, Aseervatham provided an affidavit to his Canadian lawyer outlining the physical and psychological torture he suffered while detained in a Sri Lankan prison. This affidavit was provided to the Refugee Protection Division in private proceedings for other Sun Sea migrant hearings. It was later discovered that Canadian immigration authorities had shared this confidential affidavit with the Sri Lankan authorities who allegedly tortured Aseervatham. He was subsequently killed in Sri Lanka when an unknown motorist struck him on the street.

Kirushna Kumar Kanagaratnam was another passenger murdered sometime late in 2015, being one of a number of men killed by serial killer Bruce McArthur in Toronto. His refugee claim, too, had been denied.

See also
 Komagata Maru incident
 Roxham Road
 Sri Lankan Tamil diaspora

References

External links
 Ship information on MarineTraffic

2010 in British Columbia
Refugees in Canada
Canadian immigration law
Sri Lankan Tamil diaspora
1980 ships
Merchant ships of Thailand
Maritime incidents in Canada
Maritime incidents in 2010
Canada–Sri Lanka relations
2010 disasters in Canada